Edinburgh bus station (previously St Andrew Square bus station) is the bus station serving central Edinburgh, which opened in its present form in February 2003.

The bus station is on Elder Street, where the buses enter, with pedestrian access also at St Andrew Square. Buses and coaches serve Glasgow, Berwick-upon-Tweed, Perth, Dundee, Aberdeen and Fife. Megabus and National Express also serve the station to destinations that are mainly in England and Wales. The bus station is along with the adjacent Multrees Walk development, which includes Harvey Nichols and many other high-end retailers and was designed by the Edinburgh office of the architectural firm CDA.

History
St Andrew Square bus station was opened in April 1957 by the operator Scottish Motor Traction, with 16 stances over 5 platforms and underground subways connecting the platforms. By the late 1960s, an office block had been built above the station. Its building supports ate into the platforms and so reduced the available space.

The station closed on 2 July 2000, as part of developments of the site, which included a new bus station and Scotland's first Harvey Nichols store.

During its reconstruction, a number of issues appeared. Several bus operators complained that the departure fees were too high and planned not to transfer services back into the bus station. Plans were considered that would have moved the bus station within four years to a new redevelopment at Waverley. In a report to councilors, the director of city development, Andrew Holmes, said: "With the delivery of this project now a firm prospect in the next few years, there are potentially opportunities for accommodating integrated facilities for strategic bus services".

The new, more modern bus station opened in February 2003, four months late. It was built and is owned by Coal Pension Properties, as part of the redeveloped site, and is leased by The City of Edinburgh Council.

Since the station reopened, major issues have repeatedly arisen. Within days of its opening, bus drivers were complaining that the ramp into the station was too steep and was catching the bottom of their vehicles. That problem was resolved within a week, with minor changes were made to the ramp.

In 2003, faulty ceiling tiles had to be replaced to ensure that they did not fall onto passers-by.

In 2007, roof planes shut the bus station after they become detached from the roof, which reoccurred with high winds in May 2011. Also in 2007, the offices above the station were flooded, which resulted in the ceiling collapsing and so needing extra support for nearly three years.

In 2011, The City of Edinburgh Council took Balfour Beatty to court over their claims of poor workmanship in connection to the bus station because of emergency work that needed to be carried out. One city council source said: "A new facility like this should have been much sturdier, even in bad weather.... The council only leases the bus station, but has had to pay to carry out repairs to ensure it is safe enough to open up for passengers. The final designs and work have simply not been up to scratch".

Services 
The bus station is the eastern terminus of the 900 Edinburgh–Glasgow route. From May 2014, the bus station has been served by the adjacent St Andrew Square tram stop of Edinburgh Trams, with a direct connection to and from Edinburgh Airport.

Other services include 101/102 Edinburgh–Dumfries.

References

External links

Edinburgh Bus Station location and facilities, City of Edinburgh Council

Bus stations in Scotland
New Town, Edinburgh
Transport in Edinburgh
Transport infrastructure completed in 1957
1957 establishments in Scotland